Kotiganahalli Ramaiah (born 1954) is a Dalit poet, playwright, philosopher and cultural activist from Karnataka, India. He is one of the founders of Aadima, an institution that experiments with children's theatre, film, education and caste consciousness.

He was an Aam Aadmi Party candidate for Kolar Lok Sabha constituency in the 2014 Indian general election.

Early life and career
Kotiganahalli Ramaiah was born in the village of Kotiganahalli in Kolar district, Karnataka. He quit college, before completing a degree, to join the Dalit Sangharsha Samiti, a political group that spearheaded the struggle against caste discrimination and fought to acquire land rights for the former untouchables castes in Karnataka. He rose to be an instrumental figure in the Dalit movement where his contribution is most remembered for the numerous songs of resistance and struggles penned by him, some of which were adapted from the political climate of the left movement in Andhra Pradesh, particularly those by the revolutionary poet Gaddar. During this period Ramaiah also worked as a journalist with Lankesh Patrike, Mungaru and Suggi Sangati; and as a screenplay writer for numerous Kannada films and television serials.

Founding of Aadima
Disillusioned with what he perceived as a lack of direction within the Dalit movement, as well as the rapid erasure of the inclusive foundations of the modern Indian state, Ramaiah and a few others within the movement envisioned a broad-based cultural response to address the roots of social exclusion in India. They saved a rupee a day for many years towards the establishment of Aadima, an experimental space that aims to temper the overarching need for political modernity with an understanding of the history of cultural resistance and the philosophical meaning systems that evolved as a response to centuries of marginalisation. Aadima was founded in 2005, adjoining Shivagange Village on the Anthargange Hill Range. Since then, Aadima has been researching and documenting oral traditions and narratives, creating plays and films and, experimenting in educational pedagogy with numerous communities that live in the Anthargange Hill Range. Aadima also plays host to Hunimme Haadu, an event on full moon nights that features plays from across Karnataka.

Awards
Karnataka Sahitya Akademy Award – 2012
Suvarna Ranga Samman – Kannada Sangha Kanthavara – 2012
Karnataka Rajyotsava Award – 2005

Plays
Kaage Kannu Irve Bala
Nayi Thippa
Ratnapaksi
Kannaspatre Quenalli Jagadambe
Hakki Hadu
Vogatina Rani
Sum Sumke
Darb Bar Buddanna
Marjina Mattu Nalavattu Jana Kallaru
Kattale Rajya

Published works
Kaage Kannu Irve Bala (2012)
No Alphabet in Sight: New Dalit Writing from South India, Dossier 2 – Editors – Susie Tharu and K. Satyanarayana (Forthcoming 2012)
Sindh Madigara Samskruti (1993)

References

1954 births
Living people
Indian male poets
Aam Aadmi Party candidates in the 2014 Indian general election
Dalit writers
21st-century Indian politicians
Poets from Karnataka
Indian male dramatists and playwrights
21st-century Indian philosophers
Dramatists and playwrights from Karnataka
Recipients of the Rajyotsava Award 2005